The idea of head music versus body music is an aesthetic idea in musicology. The distinction has been illustrated by comparing rock n roll with progressive rock, where the intention turned to innovation and experimentation, and "to offer 'head music' for thinking rather than body music for dancing".

References

Aesthetics
Musicology